Patrick McNeill (born March 17, 1987) is a Canadian former professional ice hockey defenceman who is currently playing men's senior hockey with the Strathroy Jets of the Wester Ontario Super Hockey League (WOSHL).

Playing career
Born in Strathroy, Ontario, and a first overall pick in the Ontario Hockey League Priority Selection in  2003 by the Saginaw Spirit, McNeill then earned gold with Team Ontario during the 2004 World U-17 hockey challenge, gold with Team Canada during the 2004 World Junior Cup and a spot on both the 2005 OHL All Star squad and the Team Canada training squad at the 2005 IIHF World U18 Championships.

He was drafted 118th overall in the 2005 NHL Entry Draft by the Washington Capitals. After signing an entry-level contract with Capitals, McNeill spent the next six seasons of his professional career with AHL affiliate, the Hershey Bears. He claimed two Calder Cups and ranked 8th in all-time scoring for the Bears amongst defenseman with 152 points.

On July 6, 2013, McNeill left the Capitals organization as a free agent and signed a one-year, two way contract with the Columbus Blue Jackets. In his only year within the Blue Jackets, McNeill was assigned to AHL affiliate, the Springfield Falcons for the duration of the 2013–14 season. He responded with a career high 11 goals and 37 points in 63 games for the Falcons.

On July 5, 2014, McNeill signed as a free agent to a one-year, two way contract with the Arizona Coyotes. He was assigned to AHL affiliate, the Portland Pirates for the 2014–15 season.

At the conclusion of his seventh year in the American League, McNeill signed his first contract abroad, agreeing to a one-year deal with German club, ERC Ingolstadt of the DEL on June 1, 2015. In his first DEL season he was best scored defenseman of the league with 39 points.

After three seasons in Ingolstadt, McNeill left as a free agent, opting to continue in the DEL with Augsburger Panther on a one-year deal on June 8, 2018.

Patrick McNeill has played several times for the Canadian national team. He played for Team Canada in Deutschland Cup 2016, he also participated in the scouting tournaments of Team Canada's olympic preparation.

Career statistics

Regular season and playoffs

International

Awards and honours

References

External links

1987 births
Living people
Augsburger Panther players
Canadian ice hockey defencemen
Hershey Bears players
Ice hockey people from Ontario
ERC Ingolstadt players
People from Strathroy-Caradoc
Portland Pirates players
Saginaw Spirit players
South Carolina Stingrays players
Springfield Falcons players
Washington Capitals draft picks
Canadian expatriate ice hockey players in Germany